Sagån River is a river,  in length, which flows through Enköping Municipality, Västerås Municipality and Sala Municipality, Sweden. Its source is Doften, a lake in Heby Municipality. It flows south into Mälaren (Lake Malar), Svealand, the third-largest freshwater lake in Sweden. Its tributaries are Lillån (past Björksta and Tortuna), Isätrabäcken and Lillån (through Sala).

Historically, the river marked the southern boundary between Småland and Blekinge and the northern frontier of Ödmården, Gastrikland.

Norrby Church, which stands immediately to the east of Sala, stands on the eastern banks of the river.

Brooches were discovered in a 9th-century Viking boat burial on the river's Brytilsholmen Island in 1901.

References 

Rivers of Sweden